Koodal is the second largest town in Konni Taluk at Pathanamthitta District, located in Kerala state, India.Koodal Situates On Main Eastern Highway (Punalur-Muvattupuzha Road).

Location
Koodal is located on the Main Eastern Highway (Punalur-Pathanamthitta-Muvattupuzha Road / SH - 08) between Konni and Pathanapuram.  A panchayat  stadium is situated in koodal for sports and other cultural activities

Transportation
Koodal is accessible by bus from Punalur (19 km), and Konni 11 km and the nearest railway stations are Punalur, Chengannur, Thiruvalla, Avaneeswaram and Kayamkulam. The nearest airport is Trivandrum International Airport. Nearest temple is koodal sreedevi temple

Schools

 Govt.VHSS & HSS Koodal 
 Koodal Govt. LP school
 Sn Public School

Population
Koodal has a mixed population of Hindus, Muslims and Christians. Many of the inhabitants of this village are settlers there due to the introduction of rubber plantations, mainly by the plantation corporation of Kerala and the A.V. Thomas and company. A number of people from Koodal are employed abroad, mainly in the Middle East and US. Koodal has its own police station, primary health centre, Government Vocational Higher Secondary School and other public schools, post office, panchayath mini stadium, homeo clinic ,ice cream factory etc...

Clubs and associations
 Koodal has a Rotary club  and various other cultural and youth clubs.
 Lions Club
 Punnamood Grandasala
 Navodaya Arts and Sports Club
 Pulari Club
 Yuva Arts And Sports Club Kurangayam
 Cosmos Arts And Sports Club Stadium
 Brothers Club Stadium

Churches & Temples
ST PIUS MALANKARA CATHOLIC CHURCH
Koodal St Marys Orthodox Mahaedavaka
Koodal St Pauls Orthodox Church
Kalanjoor St George Orthodox Valiyapally
India Pentecostal Church of God
Bethel Assemblies of God church
The Pentecostal Mission 
Bethel Marthoma church
Koodal-St George Jacobite Church
Koodal Sreedevi Temple
Karakkakuzhi Sree Bhadrakali Temple
Karakkakuzhi Sree Mahadeva Temple

References

External links

Villages in Pathanamthitta district